James Sharpe may refer to:

 James Sharpe (Australian politician) (1868–1935)
 James Sharpe (Canadian politician) (1846–1935), English-born pioneer and politician in Ontario
 James Sharpe (Dutch politician) (born 1962), businessman and athlete
 James Sharpe (Jesuit) (1577–1630), English professor of scripture
 James Sharpe (historian), University of York

See also 
 James Sharp (disambiguation)
 Sharpe James (born 1936), politician from New Jersey